Love Again is the 26th studio album by American singer-songwriter John Denver released in 1996.  It was released by CMC Records.

It is alternatively known as The Unplugged Collection and A Celebration of Life (1943–1997). A Celebration of Life (1943–1997), however, consists of only twelve of the sixteen tracks included on the other versions and in an altered sequence.

The album was recorded in September 1996 and featured new renditions of many of Denver's most popular songs.

Track listing
(Love Again and The Unplugged Collection)
 "Annie's Song"
 "Perhaps Love"
 "Dreamland Express"
 "Rocky Mountain High"
 "Seasons of the Heart"
 "Whispering Jesse"
 "Take Me Home, Country Roads"
 "For You"
 "Windsong"
 "Leaving on a Jet Plane"
 "I'm Sorry"
 "Back Home Again"
 "Sunshine on My Shoulders"
 "Thank God I'm a Country Boy"
 "Christmas for Cowboys"
 "Love Again"

Track listing
(A Celebration of Life (1943–1997))
 "Whispering Jesse"
 "Dreamland Express"
 "Rocky Mountain High"
 "Take Me Home, Country Roads"
 "Christmas for Cowboys"
 "Love Again"
 "Sunshine on My Shoulders"
 "Perhaps Love"
 "Leaving on a Jet Plane"
 "Windsong"
 "I'm Sorry"
 "Back Home Again"

References

John Denver albums
1996 compilation albums
CMC International compilation albums